Panthera uncia pyrenaica, also known as the Arago snow leopard or as the European snow leopard, is a subspecies of snow leopard (Panthera uncia) that lived during the Middle Pleistocene in southern France.

It was originally interpreted as a leopard fossil, and given the name Panthera pardus tautavelensis in the Program/Guide book for 16th International Cave Bear and Lion Symposium; however, this name, since it was not formally published in a scientific journal, it was unavailable due to being a nomen nudum.

References

Pleistocene carnivorans
Snow leopards
Prehistoric pantherines
Extinct animals of Europe
Fossil taxa described in 2022